Cho Yong-jin (born November 20, 1984), known professionally as Ali (알리), is a South Korean singer, songwriter, pianist, radio host and professor in applied musical arts at the Seoul Technical Arts College. Following her debut in 2009, she was primarily recognized for her time as a contestant on the KBS program Immortal Songs 2.

Career
ALi debuted as a singer in 2009, and gained fame for her appearances on music shows, most notably Immortal Songs 2 on KBS2 and King of Mask Singer on MBC. Currently, ALi has the highest score and most wins for a female artist on Immortal Songs 2, hence her being known as the "madam of Immortal Songs". She also worked as a professor in applied musical arts at the Seoul Technical Arts College.
As a professor, ALi has taught BtoB members, Changsub and Hyunsik.

ALi released her first album SOULri in December 2011, two years after her official debut. One released track, "Na Young", garnered immediate controversy as it referenced a sexual assault case that had become publicly known in South Korea. Many detractors criticized the song for being insensitive to the subject of its lyrics.  ALi later addressed this controversy by revealing that she herself was a survivor of sexual assault. Following the release of her album, she held her first independent concert. She was also a vocalist on several Leessang songs, including "Ballerino" and "I'm Not Laughing". She has also released several OSTs for Korean dramas, including "Hurt" ("상처") from "Rooftop Prince", "The Vow" from "Golden Rainbow" and "In My Dream" from "Empire of Gold".

Recently, Ali has made her musical debut in the Korean rendition of the musical Rebecca and started working on her own label and radio station.

Discography

Studio albums

Extended plays

Singles

Soundtrack appearances

Filmography

Television shows

Awards

 2009 : Cyworld Digital Music Awards – Female Newcomer of the Year
 2012 : Hong Kong Asian-Pop Music Festival – Best Vocal Performance & 2nd Asian Super Nova

References

1984 births
Living people
South Korean women pop singers
21st-century South Korean singers
21st-century South Korean women singers
South Korean mezzo-sopranos
South Korean contemporary R&B singers
South Korean soul singers